Karlawad is a village in Dharwad district of Karnataka, India.

Demographics 
As of the 2011 Census of India there were 262 households in Karlawad and a total population of 1,299 consisting of 669 males and 630 females. There were 128 children ages 0-6.

References

Villages in Dharwad district